The Denmark national youth handball team is the national under–18 Handball team of Denmark. Controlled by the Danish Handball Federation it represents Denmark in international matches.

History

Youth Olympic Games

Youth European Olympic Games

World Championship

European Championship

References

External links
Official website 

 

Handball in Denmark
Men's national youth handball teams
Handball
Youth sport in Denmark